Berthelinia limax is a species of a sea snail with a shell comprising two separate hinged pieces or valves. It is a marine gastropod mollusc in the family Juliidae.

Distribution
The type locality for this species is Seto, Aichi, Japan.

Berthelinia limax is found in Pacific localities such as Japan, Australia, California, Hawaii, Jamaica in the Atlantic, and more recently in the Indian Ocean region.

References

Juliidae
Gastropods described in 1959